is a city located in Miyagi Prefecture, Japan. , the city had an estimated population of 28,539, and a population density of 190 persons per km² in 11,494 households.

Geography
Kakuda is in southeastern Miyagi Prefecture in the Tōhoku region of northern Japan. The Abukuma River flows through the city.

Neighboring municipalities
Miyagi Prefecture
Shiroishi
Watari
Yamamoto
Wakuya
Shibata
Ōgawara
Marumori

Climate
Kakuda has a humid climate (Köppen climate classification Cfa) characterized by mild summers and cold winters. The average annual temperature in Kakuda is 12.6 °C. The average annual rainfall is 1259 mm with September as the wettest month. The temperatures are highest on average in August, at around 24.9 °C, and lowest in January, at around 1.6 °C.

Demographics
Per Japanese census data, the population of Kakuda peaked around 1950 and has fluctuated in the decades since, with a general trend of decline.

History
The area of present-day Kakuda was part of ancient Mutsu Province, and was the location of Kakuda Castle during the Sengoku period. It was part of the holdings of Sendai Domain during the Edo period under the Tokugawa shogunate.

The town of Kakuda was established with the creation of the post-Meiji restoration modern municipalities system on April 1, 1889. It annexed the neighboring villages of Kitago, Sakura, Nishine, Higashine, Fujio, and Edano on October 1, 1954. Kakuda was raised to city status on October 1, 1958.

Government
Kakuda has a mayor-council form of government with a directly elected mayor and a unicameral city legislature of 18 members.　Kakuda, together with neighboring Marumori, contributes one seat to the Miyagi Prefectural legislature. In terms of national politics, the city is part of Miyagi 3rd district of the lower house of the Diet of Japan.

Economy
Kakuda has a mixed economy based on light manufacturing of automotive parts and electrics, and on agriculture, primarily the cultivation of soybeans and plums. The area was traditionally noted for its sericulture.

Education
Kakuda has eight public elementary schools and three public middle schools operated by the city government and one public high school operated by the Miyagi Prefectural Board of Education. The prefecture also operates one special education school for the handicapped.

Transportation

Railway
AbukumaExpress – Abukuma Express Line 
  -  -  -

Highway

Sister city relations
 - Greenfield, Indiana, United States from September 12, 1990
 - Ishikawa, Fukushima, Japan, since April 16, 1979
 - Kuriyama, Hokkaido, Japan, since August 26, 1978

Local attractions
Kōzō-ji – Buddhist temple
JAXA Kakuda Space Center
Site of Kakuda Castle
Yanase-ura Site, archaeological site with Jomon period settlement traces, National Historic Monument

Noted people from Kakuda 
Shinichi Ito, motorcycle racer

References

External links
Official Website 

 
Cities in Miyagi Prefecture